The 52/17 Rule is a time management method that recommends 52 minutes of focused working alternated by 17 minutes of complete resting and recharging. 

This principle was first laid out in an article for The Muse in 2014 and has since then been covered by numerous other media outlets. The 52/17 productivity principle was initially discovered and explained by the time tracking and productivity app DeskTime.

Original study 

The study's objective was to analyze the most productive people and discover the correlation between their work hours and productivity levels. To do that, the top 10% of most productive people using the DeskTime app were isolated based on having the highest ratio of using “productive” applications for their line of work.

Then the app analyzed their computer-use behavior during one workday. It was discovered that on average, their workday was divided into 52-minute sprints of purposeful working and 17-minute breaks which they spent away from the computer.

Reception 

After the success of the original article in The Muse, the method was also extensively covered by Inc., Lifehacker, The Atlantic, Fast Company and The Washington Post. Thanks to that, the method has continued to gain popularity and other productivity apps and tools, for example, a mobile app and a browser timer were built in dedication to this productivity tactic.

Comparison to the Pomodoro Technique 

Similar to the Pomodoro Technique, the 52/17 Productivity Principle uses a strict working-resting ratio to achieve higher productivity. However, Pomodoro Technique is based on a 25/5 minute schedule. While the Pomodoro Technique has been very popular for decades, some productivity bloggers have reported that its 25-minute time slots are too short to produce effective results, and have instead opted for the 52/17 rule.

See also
 Life hack
 Attention span
 Pomodoro Technique

References

Time management
Personal time management